Let's Dance 2013 was the eight season of the Swedish Let's Dance series on TV4. It premiered on 29 March 2013.

Couples

Scoring chart

Average chart

Average dance chart

References

External links
Official website of Let's Dance (Swedish)

2013
TV4 (Sweden) original programming
2013 Swedish television seasons